The 2011 Nigerian Senate election in Jigawa State was held on April 9, 2011, to elect members of the Nigerian Senate to represent Jigawa State. Abdulmumini M. Hassan representing Jigawa South-West, Abdulaziz Usman representing Jigawa North-East and Danladi Abdullahi Sankara representing Jigawa North-West all won on the platform of Peoples Democratic Party.

Overview

Summary

Results

Jigawa South-West 
Peoples Democratic Party candidate Abdulmumini M. Hassan won the election, defeating other party candidates.

Jigawa North-East 
Peoples Democratic Party candidate Abdulaziz Usman won the election, defeating other party candidates.

Jigawa North-West 
Peoples Democratic Party candidate Danladi Abdullahi Sankara won the election, defeating party candidates.

References 

Jigawa State Senate elections
Jigawa State senatorial elections
Jigawa State senatorial elections